Vishwaroopam is a 2013 Indian spy thriller film directed by Kamal Haasan. Besides starring in the lead role with Pooja Kumar, Haasan co-produced the film with S. Chandrahaasan and Prasad V. Potluri, and co-wrote the script with Atul Tiwari. Andrea Jeremiah, Rahul Bose, Shekhar Kapur and Nassar play supporting roles in the film. The film's story revolves around Wisam Ahmed Kashmiri, a spy from India's intelligence agency Research and Analysis Wing, stopping a group of Al-Qaeda terrorists led by Omar (Bose) from triggering a dirty bomb made by scraping caesium from oncological equipment in New York City. A bilingual film, made in Tamil and Hindi (as Vishwaroop), the soundtrack and score were composed by Shankar–Ehsaan–Loy. Sanu Varghese and Mahesh Narayanan were in charge of the film's cinematography and editing respectively. Lalgudi N. Ilaiyaraaja and Boontawee 'Thor' Taweepasas were in charge of art direction while Birju Maharaj handled the choreography.

Vishwaroopam was made on a budget of ₹950 million. The film was released on 25 January 2013 worldwide except Tamil Nadu where it was banned due to protest by Islamic organisations which cited that Muslims were depicted in a negative manner. The ban on the film was lifted and it released on 7 February 2013 after a mutual agreement between Haasan and the organisations; the Hindi version was released on 1 February 2013. Both versions received generally positive reviews and were commercial successes at the box office, collectively grossing ₹2.2 billion overall.

The film won 13 awards from 36 nominations; its direction, performances of the cast members, music, cinematography, editing, art direction and choreography have received the most attention from award groups. At the 60th National Film Awards, Vishwaroopam won the Best Choreography and Best Production Design. It received three nominations:
Best Film, Best Director and Best Actor at the 61st Filmfare Awards South, winning none. The film won three awards from sixteen nominations at the 8th Vijay Awards, including Best Film (Kamal, S. Chandrahaasan, Potluri), Best Supporting Actress (Jeremiah), and Best Villain (Bose); Kamal won the Best Actor and Favourite Director, while Ilayaraaja and Taweepasas received the award for Best Art Director. Vishwaroopam received seven nominations at the 3rd South Indian International Movie Awards. Among other wins, the film received four Ananda Vikatan Cinema Awards, two Tamil Nadu State Film Awards and two awards at the Jagran Film Festival.

Accolades

See also 
 List of Tamil films of 2013

Notes

References

External links 
 Accolades for Vishwaroopam at the Internet Movie Database

Vishwaroopam